Anthony Massimino (born 20 August 1979) is an Italian baseball player who competed in the 2004 Summer Olympics.

References

1979 births
Living people
Olympic baseball players of Italy
Baseball players at the 2004 Summer Olympics
Parma Baseball Club players
Place of birth missing (living people)